The Eternal Triangle is a 1917 British silent romance film directed by Frank Wilson and starring Chrissie White, Stewart Rome and Violet Hopson. A woman loves a poor squire's son but marries a much wealthier playwright who is subsequently killed in a car accident.

Cast
 Chrissie White as Margaret Clive 
 Stewart Rome as Frank Waring  
 Violet Hopson as Audrey 
 Lionelle Howard as Sackville Horton  
 W.G. Saunders as Squire Waring 
 Harry Gilbey 
 Mrs. Bedells

References

Bibliography
 Palmer, Scott. British Film Actors' Credits, 1895-1987. McFarland, 1988.

External links

1917 films
1910s romance films
British romance films
British silent feature films
Films directed by Frank Wilson
Films set in England
Hepworth Pictures films
British black-and-white films
1910s English-language films
1910s British films